{{DISPLAYTITLE:Phi3 Hydrae}}

Phi3 Hydrae (φ3 Hya) is a binary star in the equatorial constellation of Hydra. It originally received the Flamsteed designation of 2 Crateris before being placed in the Hydra constellation. Based upon an annual parallax shift of 15.49 mas as seen from Earth, it is located around 211 light years from the Sun. It is visible to the naked eye with an apparent visual magnitude of 4.90.  It forms a triangle with the fainter φ1 Hydrae and φ2 Hydrae, between μ Hydrae and ν Hydrae.

This is a single-lined spectroscopic binary star system with an orbital period of about 1,200 days and an eccentricity of 0.1. The primary, component A, is an evolved G-type giant star with a stellar classification of G8 III. It is a red clump star, which means it is generating energy through the fusion of helium at its core. The star has twice the mass of the Sun and has expanded to 9 times the Sun's radius. It is 1.17 billion years old and is radiating 48 times the solar luminosity from its photosphere at an effective temperature of 4,952 K.

References

G-type giants
Horizontal-branch stars
Spectroscopic binaries
Hydra (constellation)
Hydrae, Phi3
Durchmusterung objects
Crateris, 2
092214
052085
4171